Film-Philosophy is a peer-reviewed open-access academic journal covering the engagement between film studies and philosophy. The editor-in-chief is David Sorfa.

See also
 Linguistic film theory

References

External links

Aesthetics journals
English-language journals
Online-only journals
Open access journals
Publications established in 1997
Open Humanities Press academic journals
Edinburgh University Press academic journals